Stewartby railway station is a station on the London Northwestern Railway, which serves the Bedfordshire village of Stewartby in England. It is the nearest station to the Marston Vale Millennium Country Park.

Services
Stewartby station, in common with others on the Marston Vale Line, is covered by the Marston Vale Community Rail Partnership, which aims to increase use of the line by involving local people.  An hourly service runs in each direction Monday to Saturday, but no trains call on Sundays.

History
When first opened in 1905 by the London and North Western Railway, the station was a halt serving the small village of Wootton Pillinge, a largely rural community that, in 1897, had become the site of B.J.H. Forder's brickworks. The plant was served by sidings close to and alongside the halt which were controlled by a signal box; the halt was simply constructed with a platform at ground level constructed out of sleepers. By 1910, the Wootton Pillinge Brick Company was selling 48 million bricks per year and in 1923, it merged with the London Brick Company (LBC). The brickworks developed virtually across the railway line and as the wagon capacity of the old sidings was exceeded, they became an extension for a larger group of sidings developing at Wootton Broadmead. The Wootton Pillinge signal box was closed and a new box was opened called "Forder's Sidings" which controlled heavy movements from the works.

In 1926 the LBC began to build a "garden village" for its employees at Wootton Pillinge; the village was to be named "Stewartby" after Sir Halley Stewart, the former Liberal Parliamentary candidate for Peterborough and first chairman of the Wootton Pillinge Brick Company. Following the building of the village, the London, Midland and Scottish Railway renamed the station (which ceased to be a halt in 1928) to Stewartby. The Stewartby brickworks was connected to the Marston Vale Line via a  narrow gauge railway operating on overhead electrification. This is believed to have been installed in the 1930s and lasted until 1960. After reaching a peak production level of 738 million bricks in 1973, demand for bricks declined and the LBC (trading as Easidispose) signed an agreement the following year to re-use its empty clay pits as landfill transported from London. One or two daily container trains began transporting 1,000 tons of waste from Hendon to handling facilities at Stewartby.

References

Sources

External links

Railway stations in Bedfordshire
DfT Category F2 stations
Former London and North Western Railway stations
Railway stations in Great Britain opened in 1905
Railway stations in Great Britain closed in 1917
Railway stations in Great Britain opened in 1919
Railway stations served by West Midlands Trains
East West Rail